Anniesland railway station is a railway station that serves the Anniesland suburb of Glasgow, Scotland.

The station is served by ScotRail as part of the Strathclyde Partnership for Transport network.

History
Opened by the North British Railway in 1874 on their route linking the Glasgow, Dumbarton and Helensburgh Railway at Maryhill to Queens Dock (the site that is now occupied by the Scottish Exhibition Centre) on the north side of the River Clyde (the Stobcross Railway), it became part of the London and North Eastern Railway during the Grouping of 1923. The station then passed on to the Scottish Region of British Railways on nationalisation in 1948.

When Sectorisation was introduced by British Rail in the 1980s, the station was served by ScotRail until the privatisation of British Rail.

The line towards  (which was opened some years after the Maryhill line in 1886 as part of the Glasgow City and District Railway) was electrified in 1960, along with the line southwards to  &  as part of the North Clyde Line modernisation scheme.  The chord from Maryhill (which was part of the original Stobcross Railway route) remains diesel worked.  This chord was closed completely in 1985 and lifted three years later (after being disused since 1980), but relaid and reopened in 2005 when the Maryhill Line was extended as part of the project to re-open the railway to Larkhall on the Argyle Line.

After the 2005 re-opening, there had been no physical link between the two routes here – the single line from Maryhill Park Junction terminated in its own separate bay platform (number 3) on the eastern side of the station and the two routes were under the control of different signalling centres.  However, in late 2015, Network Rail carried out a programme of works to connect the Maryhill chord to the North Clyde Line, just north of Anniesland station. This was done to provide a diversionary route from the main Edinburgh to Glasgow line into  Low Level while the High Level station was shut during 2016 for tunnel works; however, it is intended that the new connection be permanent.

Services

There is a regular service daily from Anniesland to Glasgow Queen Street (Low Level) on the North Clyde Line and to Glasgow Central (Low Level) on the Argyle Line.

There is a half-hourly service from Anniesland on the Maryhill Line to Glasgow Queen Street (High Level) via  Monday to Saturdays.

Since a timetable revision on 18 May 2014, a limited hourly Sunday service operates on the route via Maryhill.

References

Sources

 
 
 
 Station on navigable O.S. map

Railway stations in Glasgow
Former North British Railway stations
Railway stations in Great Britain opened in 1874
SPT railway stations
Railway stations served by ScotRail